Dominion Enterprises is a Norfolk, Virginia-based media and information services company for the automotive, real estate, and travel industries. It has Internet and printed media operations.

History 
Dominion Enterprises was established in September 2006 by Landmark Media Enterprises (formerly Landmark Communications), following a division of assets of its predecessor company, Trader Publishing, between shared owners Landmark and Cox Enterprises. 

In May 2017, Dominion Enterprises sold Dominion Web Solutions to European firm Eurazeo and Goldman Sachs Group’s merchant banking division for $680 million. 

In September 2017, Dominion Enterprises sold ForRent.com to CoStar Group for $350 million in cash and $35 million worth of stock. 

In April 2021, Dominion Enterprises announced the sale of Homes.com to CoStar Group Inc. for $156 million.

Business activities
Dominion Enterprises provides advertising, marketing services, and software for dealers and private party sellers.  The company also develops internet technology for commercial customers.

References

Mass media companies of the United States
American companies established in 2006
Mass media companies established in 2006
Companies based in Norfolk, Virginia
2006 establishments in Virginia